William E. Donaldson Correctional Facility is an Alabama Department of Corrections prison for men located in unincorporated Jefferson County, Alabama, near Bessemer. It came to national prominence after the Casey White prison escape.

History
The prison opened as the West Jefferson Correctional Facility in 1982. On January 12, 1990, corrections officer William E. Donaldson was stabbed and killed by an inmate. The prison was later renamed in honor of officer Donaldson. Originally the prison had a capacity for 700 inmates in dormitory housing and 16 inmates in individual prison cells; the capacity increased as expansions opened.

In 1996, according to Joe Hopper, the commissioner of the Alabama Department of Corrections, the system's prison guard shortage was the most acute at Donaldson during that year. In that year the prison housed around 1,400 prisoners, with 207 prison guards watching them.

Donaldson was the main setting of the documentary film The Dhamma Brothers, which chronicles the establishment of a Vipassana meditation program for prisoners.

Operations
As of 2010 the facility can house 1,492 prisoners. The Alabama Department of Corrections classifies Donaldson as a maximum security prison. The agency uses Donaldson to house inmates who have multiple or repeated violent offenses and who ADOC cannot easily manage. Hundreds of offenders who are housed at Donaldson have life without parole sentences. The prison includes a segregation unit for 300 inmates; Donaldson's segregation unit is the largest unit in the State of Alabama. 

The correctional facility came under media scrutiny in 2022 after 7 inmates died within the span of one week.

See also

 Capital punishment in Alabama

References

External links
 Donaldson Correctional Facility

Buildings and structures in Jefferson County, Alabama
Capital punishment in Alabama
Prisons in Alabama
1982 establishments in Alabama
State government buildings in Alabama